Jan Ledecký (born 27 July 1962), better known as Janek Ledecký, is a Czech singer, songwriter, guitarist, and composer born in Prague. After graduating from Karla Sladkovského high school, he attended the Law Faculty of Charles University in Prague, earning a degree in law. Since 1981, he has played in the multiple award-winning rock band Žentour as lead vocalist and guitarist. In 1992, he launched a solo career, which he maintains to this day, having released over a dozen successful albums. He has also written and performed in several musicals, including Galileo, Hamlet, and Iago.

Ledecký has been a judge on the Czech singing show Tvoje tvář má známý hlas since 2016.

Family
Janek's son, Jonáš Ledecký (born 1993), is an artist, cartoonist, and musician.

His daughter, Ester Ledecká, (born 1995) is a snowboarder and alpine skier. She was double junior world champion in 2013, world champion in 2015, and is a three-time Olympic champion, winning in 2018 and 2022.

Janek's brother, David Ledecký, died of a drug overdose when Janek was still young.

Ledecký is the son-in-law of former professional ice hockey player Jan Klapáč.

Discography

with Žentour
 Žentour 001 (1986)
 Žentour 002 (1986 - English version of Žentour 001)
 Žentour 003 (1990)
 Žentour 004 (1990 - English version of Žentour 003)
 Žentour 005 (1991)
 Žentour 006 (1991 - English version of Žentour 005)
 Žentour 007 (2014)

Solo
Studio albums
 Na ptáky jsme krátký (1992)
 Právě teď (1993)
 Některý věci jsou jenom jednou (1995)
 Sliby se maj plnit o Vánocích (1996)
 Mít kliku (1997)
 Na chvíli měj rád (2001)
 Ikaros (2005)
 12 Vánočních nej (2007)
 Všichni dobří andělé (2014 - duets album)
 Na konci duhy (2015)

Compilations
 Promilujem celou noc (1999)

Live albums
 Jenom tak (1994)
 Sliby se maj plnit...live (2017)
 Unplugged (2019)

Soundtracks
 Hamlet (1999)
 Galileo (2002)
 Galileo - Gold Edition (2003)
 Galileo - 2CD Complete Edition (2004)
 Hamlet - The Rock Opera (2012)
 Sliby se maj plnit o Vánocích - 20 let (2016)

Video albums
 Retro life (2006)

Musicals
 Pěna dní (1993)
 Hamlet (music: Janek Ledecký; libretto: Janek Ledecký) (1999)
 Galileo (music: Janek Ledecký; libretto: Janek Ledecký) (2003)
 Vánoční zázrak aneb Sliby se maj plnit o Vánocích (music: Janek Ledecký; libretto: Janek Ledecký) (2011)
 Hamlet - The Rock Opera (2012)
 Iago (2016)

Awards
 Anděl Award - Singer of the year (1996)

References

External links
 

1962 births
Living people
20th-century Czech male singers
Czech guitarists
Male guitarists
Czech musical theatre composers
Czech composers
Musicians from Prague
21st-century Czech male singers
Czechoslovak male singers
Charles University alumni